Sir William Carpenter Rowe (bapt. 28 July 1801 – 9 November 1859) was an English jurist and the tenth Chief Justice of Ceylon.

Early Days
He was born in Launceston, Cornwall, the eldest son of Dr. Coryndon Rowe, and Ann. He was educated at Winchester College and Balliol College, Oxford.

Career
He was knighted in January 1856  The following February he was appointed Chief Justice of Ceylon to succeed William Ogle Carr. He  held the post until 1859 when he was succeeded in turn by Edward Shepherd Creasy.

While resident in Ceylon he was elected the fourth President of the Ceylon Branch of the Royal Asiatic Society, serving from 1859 to his death.

Personal life
He was married to Frances Elizabeth Storey and lived whilst in Ceylon at The Lodge, Kandy, where they had one child. He died after a short illness on 9 November 1859 at Point de Galle, Ceylon. He was buried at All Saints Church, Galle Fort, Ceylon, aged 58.

References

1801 births
1859 deaths
Chief Justices of British Ceylon
19th-century Sri Lankan people
British expatriates in Sri Lanka
19th-century British people
Knights Bachelor
People from Launceston, Cornwall
People educated at Winchester College
Alumni of Balliol College, Oxford